Cecilie Fløe Nielsen (born 8 October 2001) is a Danish footballer who plays as a striker for Elitedivisionen club HB Køge and the Denmark women's national team.

She represented Denmark at the 2019 UEFA Women's Under-17 Championship in Bulgaria.

Fløe made her senior Denmark debut on 26 October 2021, coming on as an 76th-minute substitute for Sofie Junge Pedersen in a 5–1 win against Montenegro in the 2023 FIFA Women's World Cup qualifying cycle.

References

External links

2001 births
Living people
People from Fredericia
Danish women's footballers
Women's association footballers not categorized by position